Pachomius nigrus (syn. Romitia nigra) is a jumping spider and the type species of the genus Pachomius (syn. Romitia). It is found in Guyana and French Guiana.

References

Salticidae
Invertebrates of Guyana
Spiders of Africa
Spiders of South America
Spiders described in 1947